Satyarthi is an Indian surname that may refer to
Devendra Satyarthi (1908–2003), Indian folklorist and writer of Hindi, Urdu and Punjabi literature
Kailash Satyarthi (born 1954), Indian children's rights and education advocate 
Swami Keshwanand Satyarthi (born 1943), Indian Guru of Paramhans Satyarthi Mission (Shri Nangli Sahib )